The Cellular Operators Association of India (COAI) is an Indian non-governmental trade association and advocacy group focused mainly on telecommunications industry. COAI was constituted in 1995 as a registered, non-governmental society. As of 2017, COAI has been (jointly) organizing the India Mobile Congress with the Department of Telecommunications, Government of India.

About COAI 
Over the years COAI has emerged as the official voice for the Indian telecom industry and interacts directly with Ministries, Policy Makers, Regulators, Financial Institutions and Technical Bodies. It provides a forum for discussion and exchange of ideas between these bodies and the Service Providers, who share a common interest in the development of mobile telephony in the country. COAI collaborates with other Industry Associations such as CII, FICCI, ASSOCHAM, ISPAI, VSAT, IAMAI association etc., with the objective of presenting an industry consensus view to the Government on crucial issues relating to the growth and development of the Indian telecom Industry. Recently the COAI has set up the 5G India Forum (5GIF).

COAI expanded its membership base to include four other telecom companies, namely CISCO India, Huawei Technologies, Qualcomm and Alcatel Lucent as associate members.

Members 
The core members of the COAI are:

 Bharti Airtel
 Vodafone Idea Limited
 Reliance Jio Infocomm

The associate members of the COAI are:

 ACT Fibernet
 Apple India Pvt. Ltd
 Amazon India
 Ciena
 Cisco
 Ericsson
ECI Telecom
 Facebook
 Google
 Huawei
 IBM India
 Indus Towers
Juniper Networks
 Nokia
 Qualcomm
 Sterlite Technologies
  ZTE India

Events 
COAI organizes the India Mobile Congress in association with the Department of Telecommunications (DoT) on an annual basis in New Delhi, India. The event attracts international attention and participation. So far, the following events have been organized: India Mobile Congress 2017, India Mobile Congress 2018 and India Mobile Congress 2019.

References

External links 
COAI website

Non-profit organisations based in India
 
1995 establishments in Delhi
Trade associations based in India
Chambers of commerce in India
Organisations based in Delhi
Organizations established in 1995